Pont Saint-Michel is a bridge linking the Place Saint-Michel on the left bank of the river Seine to the Île de la Cité. It was named after the nearby chapel of Saint-Michel.  It is near Sainte Chapelle and the Palais de Justice. The present 62-metre-long bridge dates to 1857.

History
First constructed in 1378, it has been rebuilt several times, most recently in 1857.

The medieval bridge 
The construction of a stone bridge was decided upon in 1378 by the Parlement de Paris after an accord with the chapter of the cathedral of Notre-Dame de Paris, the provost of Paris, and the city's merchants.  A location downstream of Petit-Pont was chosen, on the line of Rue Saint-Denis, from the Grand-Pont on the right bank and of Rue de la Harpe on the left bank.  This allowed for a direct route across Île de la Cité.

The provost, Hugues Aubriot, was charged with overseeing the project, which was funded by the king.  Construction lasted from 1379 to 1387.  Once complete, the Parisians named the bridge Pont-Neuf (New Bridge, but it should not be confused with the present-day Pont-Neuf), Petit-Pont-Neuf (Little New Bridge) or Pont Saint-Michel dit le Pont-Neuf (St. Michael's Bridge, known as the 'New' Bridge).

As was common in the Middle Ages, the bridge's sides were quickly filled with houses. During the 1407–1408 winter, one of the longest and most severe known in the Middle Ages, ice carried by the frozen Seine hit the bridge, causing it to collapse, together with its houses. Due to France's difficulties in the Hundred Years' War, the bridge was immediately rebuilt in wood.  This material proved less resistant than the previous stone bridge and the Parlement of Paris decided in 1444 to allocate all money raised from fines to building a new stone bridge on the site.

The appearance of this second bridge is known from one miniature painting in the Hours of Étienne Chevalier, painted by Jean Fouquet.  This shows a bridge resting on high wooden piers, as well as wattle-and-daub or wood-and- plaster houses with a single level roofline along the whole length of the bridge.

The Renaissance bridge 

A replacement bridge was built at the same time the Pont Marie was under construction.  Owned by the king, it was more substantial than the Pont Marie and never ran into the kind of structural troubles both the Pont Marie and the Pont Neuf encountered.

The work started in 1617 and was completed in 1623, using foundations similar to the ones used in the Rialto Bridge and the Pont des Boucheries.

Built with four spans in the form of circular arcs, the roadway sloped up to the center of the bridge with a grade of over 6%. The widest of the old Paris bridges, it was designed to hold two rows of houses. An order was issued in 1786 to remove all houses from Paris bridges, but the ones on this bridge remained until 1808.

The modern bridge 

The present 62-metre-long bridge dates to 1857, requiring only seven months for construction, from the date the older bridge was closed to traffic, and was designed on three 17.2m arches by Paul-Martin Gallocher de Lagalisserie and Paul Vaudrey. It was the site of many of the killings of protesters by the police, in the Paris massacre of 1961, and a commemoration plaque on the bridge was unveiled by the mayor of Paris in 2001.

Location

Gallery

Bibliography
  P. Lorentz et D. Sandron, Atlas de Paris au Moyen Âge, Paris, 2006, Parigramme.

References

External links 

  Mairie de Paris site
  Structurae
 Satellite view on Google Map
  (1378–1387)
  (1416)
  (1549)
  (1618–1624)
  (current)

Saint-Michel
Saint-Michel
Buildings and structures in the 1st arrondissement of Paris
Buildings and structures in the 4th arrondissement of Paris
Buildings and structures in the 5th arrondissement of Paris
Buildings and structures in the 6th arrondissement of Paris
1857 establishments in France